Pahar Go Pangcoga, popularly known as Hasset Go or Chef Hasset (August 8, 1986 – October 24, 2015) was a Filipino celebrity chef and entrepreneur. He appeared in several television shows and gained prominence nationwide.

Personal life
Go was born on August 8, 1986 in Oroquieta, Misamis Occidental. He was the second child. His siblings were Hisham and Rowden. His parents separated when he was young and decided to help his mother in their pastry business. After finishing high school, he took a crash course on baking with Chef Heny Sison and became the youngest Filipino pastry chef at age 18. Go travelled back to Manila to work as assistant pastry chef at Chef Ed Quimpo's Cosmopolitan Cuisine restaurant. After a few years, he managed to set up his own cake shop called Medchef. He then became involved in promoting local Filipino pastries with the Department of Tourism. He was also an active youth advocate inspiring young provincianos to become entrepreneurs.

Death 
Go died from liver cancer on October 24, 2015 in Manila, Philippines. His brother Rowden died from the same illness on June 11, 2014 before Hasset died. 
And then later on, 2 years after his death, his younger brother Hisham, the youngest among the Go brothers, also died from Stage 4 liver cancer on November 14, 2017.

His life story was featured in Magpakailanman, aired on December 3, 2016 and Benjamin Alves portrayed the role of Go.

References

See also
GMA Network

1986 births
2015 deaths
Filipino chefs
Pastry chefs
Filipino people of Chinese descent
People from Misamis Occidental
Deaths from liver cancer
Misamis Occidental